San Bernardo Mixtepec (also, San Bernardo and Mixtepec) is a town and municipality in Oaxaca, Mexico.
It is part of the Zimatlán District in the west of the Valles Centrales Region

References

Municipalities of Oaxaca